Henry Fairfax, 4th Lord Fairfax of Cameron (30 December 1631 – 13 April 1688) of Denton, Yorkshire was a Scottish peer and politician. He was the grandson of Thomas Fairfax, 1st Lord Fairfax of Cameron. 
 

He was born the son of Henry Fairfax, of York, Rector of Bolton Percy, Yorkshire and Lady Mary Cholmondeley (1593-1649) and educated at Gray's Inn. 

He took part in the Yorkshire rising in support of George Monck in January 1660 under the leadership of his cousin Thomas Fairfax, 3rd Lord Fairfax. He later succeeded his cousin in 1671, inheriting the family estate at Denton, North Yorkshire.

He sat in Parliament to represent Yorkshire in March and October 1679 and again in 1681. 

He married Frances Barwick, and they had ten children:
 Mary Fairfax (born 29 July 1653)
 Dorothy Fairfax (born 30 December 1655)
 Thomas Fairfax, 5th Lord Fairfax of Cameron (born 1657)
 Henry Fairfax Of Toulston (born 20 April 1659)
 Ursula Fairfax (born 3 May 1661)
 Frances Fairfax (born 2 April 1663)
 Bryan Fairfax (born 2 April 1665)
 Barwicke Fairfax (born 18 September 1677)
 Anne Fairfax (born 27 April 1670)
 Mary Fairfax (born 1673)

References 

1631 births
1688 deaths
Members of Gray's Inn
Henry
17th-century English nobility
Lords of Parliament (pre-1707)
English MPs 1679
English MPs 1681
Lords Fairfax of Cameron